Tempurung Cave is a cave in Gopeng, Kampar District, Perak, Malaysia, located within the Kinta Valley Geopark. It is popular among spelunkers, or caving enthusiasts. More than 3 km long, it is one of the longest caves in Peninsular Malaysia. Part of it has been developed as a show cave with electric lighting and walkways and there are a range of tours of different lengths and difficulty. A fine river cave, the river passage runs about 1.6 km through the hill. There are three very large chambers and some spectacular stalactites and stalagmites.

There are plans to develop the surrounding area. By the end of 2006 a go kart centre and a horse riding area had opened.

External links

Tourism Malaysia - Tempurung Cave (Gua Tempurung)
Gua Tempurung

Caves of Malaysia
Geography of Perak
Kampar District
Show caves
Tourist attractions in Perak